Clayhanger Marsh is a 23.8 hectare (58.8 acre) biological site of Special Scientific Interest in the West Midlands. The site was notified in 1986 under the Wildlife and Countryside Act 1981. It is located to the north of Walsall.

The first vagrant bufflehead recorded in the West Midlands county was found here in June 2004.

See also
List of Sites of Special Scientific Interest in the West Midlands

References 

 Clayhanger Marsh citation sheet Natural England. Retrieved on 2008-05-28

External links 
 Clayhanger Marsh bird sightings log

Sites of Special Scientific Interest notified in 1986
Sites of Special Scientific Interest in the West Midlands (county)